Sunday Press Books is an American publisher of comic strip reprint collections founded in 2005 by Peter Maresca. The company is known as a respected reprinter of comic strips and has to date won three Eisner Awards and two Harvey Awards. Since 2022 the company is partnered with Fantagraphics in distribution and marketing.

History

Origin
In 2005, Peter Maresca was working in the digital entertainment industry when he, as a hobbyist comic strip collector since his 20s, felt the call to do something important for the upcoming 100th anniversary of the Little Nemo in Slumberland comic strip. He turned to different comic publishers which had published Little Nemo strips before to find out if any of them had something special planned to commemorate this centennial, which he then found out none of them had. He then consulted his own collection of Little Nemo strips and realized that after almost a century after being printed, the collection was becoming very fragile and was beginning to fall apart. In order to save the material for the future he tried to take his material to different publishers to put it in print in order to conserve it and make it available to readers, but none of the ones he contacted wanted to print the material in its original full publication size due to current low demand for the material and also difficulties of finding a suiting printer for the physically large material, the latter a matter which Maresca considered to be an essential aspect if he would allow his material to be put in print.

After the initial trouble of finding a publisher wanting to print his Little Nemo material, he turned to Art Spiegelman to find out if they could accomplish something practical with Maresca's Nemo material. They tried to downsize it to get it to fit a smaller format than its original size, but in the end they both agreed that the material would have to be in such a large format as it had when first published, no smaller format would do it justice. Later the same year Maresca visited the Angoulême International Comics Festival, where he talked to Fershid Bharucha of the French publishing company :fr:Éditions USA. Bharucha proposed him to take the material and convert it to digital image files and return with it to him and he would then help him to put together a book ready for printing. Once having found a suitable printer in Malaysia for the project, the project went ahead.

After the Little Nemo in Slumberland book was accomplished by Maresca, he had no further plans for Sunday Press as a publisher, his set goal had been met. He had succeeded producing a fully restored, full-size edition of the Winsor McCay classic - Litte Nemo, and was after this heading back to his regular job in digital entertainment. However, his Nemo book became a widespread success, including winning two Harvey Awards. Just a few months after its publication Maresca reconsidered his plans for Sunday Press and began thinking about what it should do next. At this time, Maresca was approached by Chris Ware, a well-known artist in the comics industry, wanting to work with Maresca on a volume of the same high standard and large format as the just-released Nemo book, but now this treatment would be applied to Gasoline Alley. Maresca accepted the offer and he and Ware put together the second Sunday Press title; Sundays with Walt and Skeezix. After this Maresca continued on his own with the publishing company's third volume, an edition of Little Sammy Sneeze, after these first three titles published he considered himself as an actual publisher and decided to keep the enterprise going.

In 2007 Sunday Press Books became a family business, when Maresca's wife Linnea Wickstrom joined the company to edit articles for the books and also managing the company. At the same time their son got also employed to take care of scanning, shipping and convention work.

Later developments
Eight years after the company's launch, Maresca did in an interview in October 2013 express that even though he is very passionate about Sunday Press' work, he stated "I hope to work with other publishers on strip-related material and partner with artists and writers to bring their favorite 'commercially unviable' projects to print", since the selling and marketing tasks are a demanding task just by itself for a micropublisher like Sunday Press Books.

IDW Publishing partnership

In July, 2019 it was announced that IDW Publishing had acquired Sunday Press Books. It was stated that Peter Maresca would be continuing to '"oversee the publishing program" of the company while IDW would manage parts such as marketing and distribution, for print as well as for digital publication. This way the publisher (SP) could focus the major work to recover comic strips which otherwise could be at risk to disappear for eternity, while IDW would manage the business aspects of the publishing company. For IDW the acquisition fits their portfolio well since their imprint The Library of American Comics and their Artist's Editions line of books already are in the same kind of archival territory. Later Maresca himself stated that the joint between Sunday Press and IDW Publishing was not an acquisition on IDW's part but a publishing agreement between the two companies. A strictly marketing and distribution agreement, with Sunday Press Books keeping its whole independency. But in the future, the partnership between the two companies would come to include some joint projects, some done by just IDW and other solely done by Sunday Press.

Fantagraphics partnership

In July 2022 it was announced that Sunday Press had partnered with Fantagraphics in a deal concerning distribution of the existing Sunday Press catalogue via Fantagraphics and also with start in 2023, the publication of new books under the Sunday Press imprint.

Publication information 

Being a smaller publisher in the hardcover comic market, Sunday Press Books' print run for each title typically varies from 1,500 to 3,000 copies per printing, with the bestselling titles often going into several printings, the two Little Nemo in Slumberland books have for example had over 12,000 copies sold by October 2013. A typical volume of a Sunday Press book takes on average close to a year to produce, the material assembly process is the longest task taking in between six and nine months to finish and get ready for printing, then the binding process takes around six weeks of time due to the publications often are handbound, after this the shipping from the printer in Asia to the U.S. takes another month.

Format

All book titles by Sunday Press are hardcover, have handsewn binding and are printed in large formats spanning from 10 × 10 inches (254 × 254 mm) to 16 × 21 inches (406 × 533 mm). The largest format resembles and recreates the feel of an original broadsheet page size, on which comic strips where to be found in newspapers during the early 1900s.

Restoration
Maresca is diligent of reproducing the old comic strips in such a way in the Sunday Press books to allow the reader to as such a close experience to the original as possible. Therefore, Maresca goes great lengths to recreate the original look and feel of the strips, printing the books with a matte paper quality, similar to newsprint look and size-wise. Maresca usually works up to an hour, at times more, to fully restore a full page of comics. All color of the source material is corrected for accuracy prior to being reproduced, a process necessary due to the old newspaper medium which the strips originally were printed on, do fade and deteriorate with time. Maresca himself describes his reproduced look as "a hybrid between a brand new newsprint and a comic strip that looks kind of faded.". Some of the source material for the publisher's reprint books comes from Maresca's own collections, others are often sourced from other comic strip collectors.

Recognition 

Many of Sunday Press' published titles have been well received in the comic culture, titles have been featured and reviewed in newspapers and periodicals such as The Atlantic, The Comics Journal, The New York Review of Books, The New York Times, Print and The Wall Street Journal. They have also received recognition such as nominations and prizes for both the Eisner Award and Harvey Award.

Eisner Awards

Nominations

2006 — "Best Archival Collection/Project - Comic Strips" — Little Nemo in Slumberland: So Many Splendid Sundays
2008
 "Best Archival Collection/Project - Comic Strips" — Little Sammy Sneeze
 "Best Archival Collection/Project - Comic Strips" — Sundays with Walt and Skeezix
 "Best Publication Design" — Litte Sammy Sneeze, designed by Philippe Ghielmetti
 "Best Publication Design" — Sundays with Walt and Skeezix, designed by Chris Ware
2010
"Best Archival Collection/Project - Strips" — Queer Visitors from the Marvelous Land of Oz
"Best Publication Design" — Queer Visitors from the Marvelous Land of Oz, designed by Philippe Ghielmetti
2011 — "Best Archival Collection/project - Strips" — Krazy Kat: A Celebration of Sundays
2012 — "Best Archival Collection/Project - Strips" — Forgotten Fantasy: Sunday Comics 1900-1915
2014 — "Best Archival Collection/Project - Strips" — Society Is Nix: Gleeful Anarchy at the Dawn of the American Comic Strip
2016 — "Best Archival Collection/Project - Strips" — White Boy in Skull Valley
2018
"Best Archival Collection/Project - Strips" — Crazy Quilt: Scraps and Panels on the Way to Gasoline Alley
"Best Archival Collection/Project - Strips" — Foolish Questions and Other Odd Observations
2019 — "Best Archival Collection/Project - Strips" — Thimble Theatre and the pre-Popeye Comics of E.C. Segar
2020 — "Best Archival Collection/Project - Strips" — Ed Leffingwell's Little Joe

Award winners

2006 — "Best Publication Design" — Little Nemo in Slumberland: So Many Splendid Sundays
2009 — "Best Archival Collection/Project - Strips" — Little Nemo in Slumberland: Many More Splendid Sundays
2017 — "Best Archival Collection/Project - Strips (at least 20 years old)" — Chester Gould's Dick Tracy, Colorful Cases of the 1930s

Harvey Awards

Award winners

2006
 "Best Domestic Reprint Project" — Little Nemo in Slumberland: So Many Splendid Sundays
 "Special Award Excellence in Presentation" — Little Nemo in Slumberland: So Many Splendid Sundays

Publications

Books

Calendars

Sunday Press Books has except from their main line of reprint books also produced some comic related calendars with comic art of the same kind as featured in their books.

References

External links 

 Sunday Press Books - Official publisher website
 Archived interview with Sunday Press' founder Peter Maresca

Book publishing companies based in California
Publishing companies established in 2005
Eisner Award winners
Eisner Award winners for Best Publication Design
Harvey Award winners
Comic book publishing companies of the United States
Companies based in Palo Alto, California